is a 2022 Japanese animated coming-of-age fantasy adventure comedy-drama film co-written and directed by Hiroyasu Ishida. Produced by Studio Colorido, the film was released simultaneously in Japanese theaters and on Netflix on September 16, 2022.

Plot

Kosuke Kumagaya and Natsume Tonai, both 11 years old, are childhood friends who grew up like siblings. The relationship between the two began to be strained after the death of Kosuke's grandfather, Yasuji. One day during the summer vacation, Kosuke and his classmates, Taishi, Yuzuru, Reina, and Juri, sneak into the "ghost housing complex" that has been slated for demolition. The housing complex was also a house full of memories where Kosuke and Natsume grew up. Kosuke unexpectedly encounters Natsume there and hears about the existence of a mysterious boy named Noppo in the complex. The group argues and heavy rain ensues. After the rain had stopped, the housing complex was suddenly drifting in the middle of the ocean.

Voice cast

Production and release
The film was first announced by Netflix in September 2021. It was announced to be produced by Studio Colorido and directed by Hiroyasu Ishida, with scripts by Ishida, as well as Hayashi Mori and Minaka Sakamoto. Akihiro Nagae designed the characters and Umitarō Abe composed the music. Zutomayo performed the film's theme song, "Kieteshimai Sō Desu" (It Seems I'm Fading Away), as well as the insert song "Natsugare" (Summer Slump). The film was released on September 16, 2022, on Netflix and in Japanese theaters.

Reception

References

External links
  
 
 
 

2022 films
2022 anime films
2020s fantasy comedy films
2020s teen comedy-drama films
2020s teen fantasy films
Animated coming-of-age films
Animated films about families
Animated films about friendship
Comedy-drama anime and manga
Animated films about children
Films set in the 2000s
Films set in 2001
Films set in 2002
Japanese animated feature films
Japanese animated fantasy films
Japanese children's films
Japanese children's fantasy films
Japanese coming-of-age films
Japanese teen drama films
Japanese-language Netflix original films
Middle school films
Netflix original anime
Studio Colorido